Karl Nikolai von Nolcken (2 February 1830 in Köljal, Ösel – 22 January 1913 in Arensburg, Ösel) was a Baltic German pastor, translator, linguist and folklorist.

Biography
Nolcken, a son of landowner Alexander von Nolcken, studied history at the University of Dorpat and was first employed as a secretary at the district court and notary of the Ritterschaftskanzlei (Knighthood firm) in Arensburg (Kuressaare). He then studied Theology at Dorpat from 1860 to 1864. From 1867 until his Emeritus in 1901 he was a pastor in Pöide Parish in Ösel.

Published works
Nolcken published poetry and theological treatises as well as two children's books in Estonian: Aabitsaraamat and

Literature 
 Carola L. Gottzmann, Petra Hörner: Lexikon der deutschsprachigen Literatur des Baltikums und St. Petersburgs. de Gruyter, Berlin 2007, S. 973.

References

External links
 Eintrag zu Nolcken in Baltisches biografisches Lexikon digital (BBLD)

19th-century Lutheran clergy
Baltic-German people
Estonian male writers
1830 births
1913 deaths
19th-century German writers
19th-century German male writers